József Tuncsik (born 23 September 1949 in Debrecen) is a Hungarian former judoka who competed in the 1976 Summer Olympics.
Hungarian Champion, 1972, 1973, 1974, 1975, 1977.
Judoka at the 1976 European Championships, 1976, Kiev.
European Champion 1976, Kiev.

References

External links
 

1949 births
Living people
Hungarian male judoka
Olympic judoka of Hungary
Judoka at the 1976 Summer Olympics
Olympic bronze medalists for Hungary
Olympic medalists in judo
Sportspeople from Debrecen
Medalists at the 1976 Summer Olympics
20th-century Hungarian people